Mona's 440 Club was the first lesbian bar to open in San Francisco, California in 1936. It continued to draw a lesbian clientele into the 1950s. Mona's and the gay bars of that era were an important part of the history of LGBT culture in San Francisco.

Mona's

Union Street, Columbus Avenue 
Mona and Jimmie Sargeant, a married couple, opened Mona's in 1934 on Union Street, taking advantage of San Francisco's liberal attitude, endless supply of tourists, and the end of prohibition. In 1936, the couple moved the bar to a basement location on Columbus Avenue in North Beach. Originally, the couple imagined the club as a bohemian hangout for writers and artists. They covered the floors with sawdust to help create the "bohemian" atmosphere.

Over the time, the vision of the club changed. The couple hired singing waitresses, and some of the female waitresses dressed in male drag. The bar became modeled after other successful female impersonation or drag clubs like Finnochio's. In 1936, the San Francisco Chronicle published a "Cocktailing, Dancing, and Dining." In the guide, Mona's was described as a "bohemian" club, which was a coded way of describing it as sexually unconventional. The bar became the first openly lesbian club that was geared towards the local gay community as opposed to gay tourists. Mona's marketed itself as a place "where girls can be boys" and featured female wait staff and entertainers dressed in tuxedos.

440 Broadway 
Due to its popularity and growth in patronage, the bar moved to 440 Broadway Street in North Beach and was subsequently renamed Mona's 440 Club. The new space quickly became popular with both straight and gay patrons, including straight women looking to relax and unwind and tourists looking for a show. Mona's 440 Club was considered to be a part of the San Francisco sex tourism culture, however the bar stuck to cross dressing in order to remain lawful. During World War II the bar attracted women that were left at home who were looking for entertainment and the company of other women, friendly and romantic. In its later days, the bar also attracted servicemen on leave.

In 1941, Mona relinquished control of the club to new manager, Babe Scott. Babe Scott was known as "the woman who plays baseball like a veteran." Scott's legacy was the performers she brought to the club.

Entertainment 
One of the biggest draws to Mona's was their large variety of in house entertainment.  Kay Scott and Babe Scott were part of the original group of entertainers to perform at Mona's 440 Club and due to their performances they became local San Francisco celebrities. The popularity of the performers drew in others who also wanted some of the same recognition.

After taking control of the bar Babe Scott booked performers such as Tina Rubio, Gladys Bentley, Frances Faye, Midge Williams, Moms Mabley and Beverly Shaw, the latter of whom became one of the club's headlining acts before moving to the Chi Chi Club across the street. Bentley remained one of Mona's most long running and popular residents due to her talent. She was a key part of Mona's culture with her cross dressing performance, as well as her ability to fit in with the growing popularity of sex and race tourism post prohibition. Bentley was recognized for her performances wearing a tuxedo and top hat. Eventually, she moved to Los Angeles to continue her career.

Legacy 
Since its launch Mona's became one of the most popular lesbian bars in the United States and its popularity helped pave the way for more lesbian bars to open in the same neighborhood, making it a "well-known lesbian enclave".

Ann's 440 Club 
Once Mona sold the club, entertainer Ann Dee (Angela Maria DeSpirito, 1919–2005), took over Mona's 440 Club in the mid 1950s and completely changed the direction of the club — starting with a new name, Ann's 440 Club. While the club still employed lesbian waitstaff and had lesbian clientele, its main focus was no longer on the queer culture and woman empowerment, but more focused on entertainment. Ann Dee wanted a place to be able to showcase her talents when she so desired and booked performers that fit her preferences. While under Ann Dee's ownership, the club gave Johnny Mathis his start.

See also

 The Lexington Club
 Maud's
 Peg's Place

References

1936 establishments in California
1950s disestablishments in California
1930s in California
1940s in California
Event venues established in 1936
Bars (establishments)
Lesbian history
LGBT culture in San Francisco
Music venues in San Francisco
Nightclubs in San Francisco
North Beach, San Francisco
Defunct LGBT nightclubs in California